The 2000 World Judo Juniors Championships was an edition of the World Judo Juniors Championships, organised by the International Judo Federation. It was held in Nabeul, Tunisia from 26 to 29 October 2000.

Medal summary

Men's events

Women's events

Source Results

Medal table

References

External links
 

World Judo Junior Championships
World Championships, U21
Judo competitions in Tunisia
Judo, 2004 World Championships U21
Judo
Judo, World Championships U21